The Primal Scream. Primal Therapy: The Cure for Neurosis (1970; second edition 1999) is a book by the psychologist Arthur Janov, in which the author describes his experiences with patients during the months he developed primal therapy. Although Janov's claims were questioned by psychologists, the book was popular and brought Janov fame and popular success, which inspired other therapists to start offering primal therapy.

Summary

In the book Janov describes the experiences he had with 63 patients during his first 18 months (starting in 1967) discovering and practicing primal therapy. He claims a 100% cure rate. The experiences he describes include a scream emitted by one of his patients, after Janov encouraged him to call out, "Mommy! Daddy!". According to Janov, the patient subsequently announced that he could "feel". Janov writes that primal therapy has in some ways returned to the early ideas and techniques of Sigmund Freud.

Publication history
The Primal Scream was first published in 1970. A revised edition was published in 1999.

Influence and reception
The Primal Scream was a popular success. It reportedly sold more than one million copies internationally, and was read by tens of thousands of people in the United States. Albert Goldman reported in The Lives of John Lennon (1988) that Janov sent pre-publication copies of The Primal Scream to celebrities such as John Lennon and Mick Jagger, and that Lennon subsequently underwent primal therapy with Janov. According to The New York Times, The Primal Scream "attracted wide attention in newspapers and magazines" and made Janov a celebrity. The fame and success it brought Janov inspired many therapists who had not met him to offer imitation primal therapy, and led to the proliferation of programs offering happiness through radical personal transformation.

Early reviews in the popular press were mixed. The book critic Robert Kirsch cautioned about Janov's "hyperbole" and "evangelic certainty" in the Los Angeles Times, but nevertheless called him an impressive writer and thinker and concluded that The Primal Scream was "worth reading and considering." The Primal Scream was praised by the Chattanooga Times and the Berkeley Gazette, both of which compared Janov to Freud. However, psychologists immediately questioned the assertions Janov made in the book, pointing out the "unverifiability of its central claim of the existence of primal pain and the lack of independent, controlled studies demonstrating the therapy’s effectiveness".

Erin Shoemaker criticized Janov's ideas about homosexuality in the gay magazine The Body Politic, noting that clinical studies contradicted Janov's view that girls become lesbians through being seduced by older women and that Janov did not have a clear idea of what constituted "real" behavior. The psychoanalyst Joel Kovel argued in A Complete Guide to Therapy (1976) that The Primal Scream shows that Janov is one of several figures in the history of psychotherapy who have come to be seen as savior figures. He credited Janov with tapping a "bedrock of great emotional power." The Primal Scream was reviewed in BMJ in 2012.

See also
 Center for Feeling Therapy

Notes

1970 non-fiction books
American non-fiction books
Books by Arthur Janov
English-language books
Primal therapy
Psychology books